Siembra is the second studio album by Panamian singer and songwritter Rubén Blades and Puerto Rican-American trombonist Willie Colón. It was released through Fania Records on 7 September 1978. It is considered the best selling salsa album in the history of salsa music and Latin music. Was recorded by Jerry Masucci and Johnny Pacheco at the La Tierra Sound Studios between 1977 and 1978.

Background
Siembra is the second of four collaborative duo albums produced by Rubén Blades and Willie Colón. During its time, it was the best-selling salsa record in history. It has sold over three million copies worldwide, and almost all of its songs were hits at one time or another in various Latin American countries. With its rousing social commentary and unconventional sound, "Siembra" set the salsa world on fire and remains one of the most original and influential works in that genre. Among Siembra's tracks, Blades' masterpiece is still "Pedro Navaja," a song that he fashioned after Bertolt Brecht's "Threepenny Opera."

Critical reception

John Bush of AllMusic gave the album a five-star rating, praising the composition of the songs by Blades as well the arrangements by Colón. Bush emphasizes the use of disco arrangements at the beginning of the first track, "Plástico", until Colón's band "slip into a devastating salsa groove". He also praised Blade's vocals, noting his high-tenor voice on "Buscando Guayaba" and tender tones on "Dime". The album was inducted into the Latin Grammy Hall of Fame in 2007.

In pop culture
The song "Buscando Guayaba" was featured in the 1988 Disney animated film Oliver & Company.

Track listing

Personnel
Willie Colón: Album Producer, Music Director, Chorus Ensemble, Trombone
Rubén Blades: Composer, Songwriter, Lead Vocals, Chorus Ensemble
Jon Fausty: Audio Engineer, Recording Schemes, Mixing
Kevin Zambrana: Asst. Audio Engineer
 Leopoldo Pineda: Trombone
 Jose Rodriguez: Trombone
 Angel (Papo) Vazquez: Trombone
 Sam Burtis: Trombone
José Torres: Piano, Fender Rhodes, Electric Piano
José Mangual Jr: Bongos, Maracas, Chorus Ensemble
Jimmy Delgado: Timbal
Adalberto Santiago: Percussion, Chorus Ensemble
Eddie Montalvo: Tumbadora, Percussion
Johnny Ortiz: songwriter (Ojos)
Bryan Brake: Drums (Plástico)
Salvador Cuevas: Bass
Eddie Rivera: Bass
Jerry Masucci: Executive Producer

References

1978 albums
Fania Records albums
Willie Colón albums
Rubén Blades albums
Latin Grammy Hall of Fame Award recipients
Salsa albums

Spanish-language albums
Albums produced by Willie Colón